"Chap Stewie" is the twenty-first episode and season finale of the twelfth season of the animated comedy series Family Guy and the 231st episode overall. It aired on Fox in the United States on May 18, 2014, and is written by Artie Johann and Shawn Ries and directed by Joe Vaux. In the episode, Peter and Chris ruin Stewie's TV time, prompting him to get revenge by travelling back in time to split Lois and Peter up so he is never conceived, but the plan goes awry when he is reborn into a British household similar to the ITV period drama Downton Abbey.

Plot
Stewie and Brian are watching Stewie's favorite show, called The Cadwalliders of Essex (a parody of Downton Abbey). Meanwhile, Peter and Chris try to knock each other down using mattresses; ignoring Stewie trying to tell them he is watching his program. This ultimately results in Peter distracting Chris by saying "Whoa Chris look, mom's naked!" hitting him, who knocks down and destroys the TV, Stewie is watching, causing him to throw a temper tantrum. Later, when Lois tries to comfort Stewie, he bites her right thumb and throws a framed picture of Meg against a door. Meg enters the living room and tries to give Stewie a hug, only for Stewie to break her nose by headbutting it. A frustrated & infuriated Lois puts Stewie in his room for an early bedtime for everything he did until he can behave himself.

The next day, Stewie reveals to Brian that he has built a new time machine and uses it to stop his conception. Going back three years into the past, he observes the events prior to his conception, like Peter having his own public access show and Lois improvising some lyrics in the theme song in Stewie's place. He discovers that Peter and Lois were truly in love but sets out to ruin things. Money fails to work so he shaves Peter's hair to get them to argue, but Lois flatters Peter, thinking that he can pass off as a celebrity. Stewie finally succeeds when he gives Peter's porn collection to Goodwill and writes "Vile Woman" on the wall. This causes Peter to leave Lois and as a result, Stewie fades from existence, but is reborn into a wealthy British family.

Things seem like fun at first, but Stewie's new older brothers Jaidan and Aidan give him a hard time and turn out to be smarter than his old family. He is dumped off to be raised by staff consisting of Nigel the butler, some maids and other assorted servants. Later that night, Stewie realizes he misses his old loving family, mainly because he was the smart one. His new father is a professor at Oxford University and he sets out there to use the lab to build a new time machine to save Peter's and Lois' marriage. Piecing together a rudimentary machine, he is almost caught by the British father but gets away.

Stewie meets his past self and tells him about his bad alternate life. Together they remind Peter and Lois of how much they love each other by leaving Peter's "I Love You" picture to Lois in the refrigerator. They patch things up as Stewie says his goodbyes to his other self as a stage light falls on the British version, who then fades away. Returning to the original timeline, Stewie is happy to be back with his real family, before Chris reveals that he has spent three years reading Peter's porn collection.

Reception
Eric Thurm of The A.V. Club gave the episode a B−, saying "Unfortunately, the focus on Stewie is also a bit of a double-edged sword. On one hand, it means that 'Chap Stewie' is one of the tightest episodes in recent Family Guy memory, rarely wandering off on tangents and delivering cutaways gags that are linked to the main story. On the other, the spotlight on Stewie means Brian is absent from the bulk of the episode, the main place 'Chap Stewie' fails in comparison to the earlier Family Guy stories it's trading on—without Brian to bounce off, Stewie’s more emotional stories don't work quite as well."

The episode received a 2.0 rating in the 18–49 years old demographic and was watched by a total of 3.88 million people. This made it the most watched show on Animation Domination that night, beating American Dad!, Bob's Burgers and The Simpsons.

References

  The plot description was adapted from Chap Stewie at Family Guy Wiki, which is available under a Creative Commons Attribution-Share Alike 3.0 license.

External links 
 

Family Guy (season 12) episodes
2014 American television episodes
Television episodes about time travel
Television episodes set in the United Kingdom